Fred S. Hollowell (January 18, 1883 – April 19, 1960) was an American farmer and politician from New York.

Life
He was born on January 18, 1883, at his family's farm in Milo, Yates County, New York. On July 21, 1909, he married Eleanor Brundage (1883–1979), and they had three children. He was a school principal in Leicester, Heuvelton and Kingston until 1914, when he returned to take care of the family farm.

Hollowell was a member of the New York State Assembly (Yates Co.) in 1932, 1933, 1934, 1935, 1936, 1937, 1938, 1939–40, 1941–42, 1943–44 and 1945. He was Chairman of the Committee on Excise from 1936 to 1938.

On March 6, 1945, he was elected to the New York State Senate (48th D.), to fill the vacancy caused by the resignation of Earle S. Warner. Hollowell was re-elected three times and remained in the State Senate until 1952, sitting in the 165th, 166th, 167th and 168th New York State Legislatures.

He died on April 19, 1960, at his farm in Milo, New York, of a heart attack; and was buried at the Lakeview Cemetery in Penn Yan.

Sources

External links
 

1883 births
1960 deaths
People from Yates County, New York
Republican Party New York (state) state senators
Republican Party members of the New York State Assembly
20th-century American politicians